Marcus Frederik Steen Grønvold (5  July 1845 – 10  October 1929) was a Norwegian painter. 
He painted genre scenes, historical and religious motifs and portraits as well as landscapes.

Biography
Grønvold was born in Bergen, Norway. His father Christian August Grønvold (1810–1889) was vicar at St. Jørgens Hospital in Bergen. He was the 
brother of painter Bernt Grønvold  (1859-1923)  and educator Didrik Hegermann Grønvold (1855–1928). His third cousin  Hans Aimar Mow Grønvold (1846–1926)  was private secretary to King Haakon VII of Norway.

He studied at the Royal Danish Academy of Fine Arts in Copenhagen between 1866 and 1869 under August Schneider. In Munich he trained under  Wilhelm von Diez from 1870 to 1871,  Otto Seitz from 1871 to 1874 and under Karl Piloty between 1874 and 1877. After study trips to Norway, Switzerland, Italy  and Paris, he settled at Munich in 1881. He published his memoirs  Fra Ulrikken til Alperne in 1925. He has two works in the National Gallery of Norway.  His art is on display at museums in Bergen, Cologne and Frankfurt.

References

 

1845 births
1929 deaths
19th-century Norwegian painters
20th-century Norwegian painters
Norwegian male painters
Artists from Bergen
Norwegian expatriates in Denmark
Norwegian expatriates in Germany
19th-century Norwegian male artists
20th-century Norwegian male artists